Vriesea parvula is a plant species in the genus Vriesea. This species is native to Brazil.

References

parvula
Flora of Brazil